Mzansi Shadrack Biemba (4 January 1965 – 8 May 2010) was a Zambian professional football player and coach.

Career

Playing career
Biemba, who played as a goalkeeper, played club football in South Africa for AmaZulu, having previously played for Bloemfontein Celtic.

Biemba also represented the Zambian national side, making 12 appearances between 1990 and 1994.

Coaching career
Biemba later becoming a goalkeeping coach with South African club side Moroka Swallows, active in that position between 2006 and 2010.

Death
Biemba died of cancer on 8 May 2010 at the age of 45.

References

1965 births
2010 deaths
Sportspeople from Lusaka
Zambian footballers
AmaZulu F.C. players
Zambian expatriates in South Africa
Zambia international footballers
Deaths from cancer in South Africa
Bloemfontein Celtic F.C. players
Black Leopards F.C. managers
Association football goalkeepers
Expatriate soccer players in South Africa
Zambian football managers